The Microbotryomycetes are class of fungi in the Pucciniomycotina subdivision of the Basidiomycota. Until recently, the class contained four orders: the Heterogastridiales, the Leucosporidiales, the Microbotryales, and the Sporidiobolales, which contained a total of 4 families, 25 genera, and 208 species. The order Kriegeriales, containing two families, Kriegeriaceae and Camptobasidiaceae, was defined in 2012.

References

Basidiomycota classes
Pucciniomycotina
Taxa named by Franz Oberwinkler
Taxa described in 2006